Abbotsford International Airport  is located in Abbotsford, British Columbia, Canada,  southwest of the city centre. It is the second largest airport in the Lower Mainland region of British Columbia, after Vancouver International Airport (YVR), and is in close proximity to British Columbia Highway 1, and the US border.

YXX offers daily domestic scheduled services and seasonal international scheduled services. The airport is equipped with a CAT 1 instrument landing system, on-site aircraft rescue and firefighting, and a fully serviced air terminal building with customs and passenger screening. It is classified as an airport of entry by Nav Canada and is staffed by the Canada Border Services Agency (CBSA) for all scheduled international arrivals. CBSA also provides clearance services to all general aviation aircraft with no more than 15 passengers.

Abbotsford Airport has a longstanding general aviation community and an established aerospace community, including Cascade Aerospace, the Conair Group, and the University of the Fraser Valley Aerospace Centre.

Abbotsford Airport is also home to the Abbotsford Shell Aerocentre FBO and flying schools, such as Coastal Pacific Aviation, Principal Air and Chinook Helicopters. YXX is highly visible to the public due to the Abbotsford International Airshow, Defense & Security Expo, and Tradex events centre.

In 2022, 992,712 passengers passed through Abbotsford International Airport.

In 2018, the airport announced it will undergo a $5 million, 14-000 square foot expansion to add new gates and additional passenger seating capacity.

History

World War II (1940-1945)

The Royal Canadian Air Force purchased the land to build Abbotsford Airport in 1940. In 1943 the construction of the three  runways based on a triangular layout was complete. The same year, under the British Commonwealth Air Training Plan, the No. 24 Elementary Flying Training School started operations from this location until 1944. The No 5 Operational Conversion Unit was split between Abbotsford and Boundary Bay Airport.

Aerodrome information
 
The aerodrome was listed as "Under construction - Servicable" and had three runways as follows:

Post war (1945-1997)
Following World War II, the airport was largely used for general aviation and as a secondary field to Vancouver International Airport. Prior to the use of instrument landing systems, fog could make Vancouver Airport unusable and flights had to land at Abbotsford. If a big earthquake floods or otherwise damages low-lying Vancouver Airport on Sea Island in Richmond, then as many flights as possible will likely be looking to land at Abbotsford Airport.
 
The airport became the home to Skyways Air Services and Conair Aviation in the 1960s. Abbotsford is still the primary base for Conair's fleet of water bombers.

In September 1984 Pope John Paul II held an open-air mass for over 200,000 people at the airport.

Current (1997-Present)
On January 1, 1997, the ownership of the Abbotsford Airport was transferred from the Department of Transport to the City of Abbotsford for a sum of $10. In June of that year, Abbotsford became a jet passenger airport in with the start of scheduled service to Alberta by WestJet. Prior, Airspeed Aviation had been the exclusive operator offering regional service to Victoria, B.C. since 1986. Canada 3000 was the first airline to offer transcontinental service from Abbotsford to Toronto in June 2000. Abbotsford's first international charter flight was to Puerto Vallarta, Mexico, in December 2003 by tour operator Transat Holidays.

Since 2000 many airlines and tour operators have come and gone from Abbotsford, including Air Canada, Air Canada Tango, Air Canada Jazz, Air North, Canada 3000, Central Mountain Air, Helijet, Jetsgo, Signature Vacations, Zoom Airlines, Harmony Airways, Peace Air and ZIP Air.

In 2010, a new parallel taxiway was added alongside runway 07/25, and the main airport apron was extended. An aircraft run-up bay that can accommodate up to three medium weight category aircraft at the same time was added near the Cascade Aerospace hangar.

From 2017, Abbotsford International Airport began to see a resurgence in air passenger numbers, with the introduction of service to Edmonton and Calgary with WestJet. In 2018, Flair Airlines introduced additional flights to Edmonton, and new flights to Winnipeg and Hamilton. Swoop, WestJet's ULCC subsidiary, began similar operations, with flights to Edmonton, Winnipeg, Hamilton, London (ON), Las Vegas, and seasonal flights to Mazatlan and Puerto Vallarta. Air Canada Rouge used to offer seasonal service to Toronto between June and October since 2015. This service was initially suspended in 2019 due to the Boeing 737 MAX groundings and once again in 2020 due to the COVID-19 pandemic. It has never returned since.

Airshow
Since 1962, the airport has hosted the annual Abbotsford International Airshow usually held the second weekend in August. Designated as Canada's national airshow in the mid 1970s by Prime Minister Pierre Trudeau, it is Canada's largest airshow as well as one of North America's largest airshows. It has been listed as one of the ten best airshows in the world.  it draws airplane enthusiasts from all over Western Canada and the Northwestern United States. The static displays allow people to get up close to many of the exhibits while numerous performances decorate the skies above.
The International Council of Airshows awarded a Silver Pinnacle Award to the airshow in 2014.

Airlines and destinations

Passenger

Cargo

Statistics

Annual traffic

Ground transportation
The airport is serviced by Central Fraser Valley Transit Route 21, which connects Aldergrove with Bourquin Exchange in Abbotsford. Per the rider guide dated 2017-09-03, it is unlikely that this service will be useful to airline passengers.

The airport is served by Ebus, on their route between Vancouver and Kamloops/Kelowna and Rider Express on their route from Vancouver to Calgary. Ebus is a carrier based in Alberta.

References

External links

Abbotsford Airport on COPA's Places to Fly airport directory
 List of where airlines fly from the Abbotsford Airport 

Abbotsford
Military airbases in British Columbia
Certified airports in British Columbia
Abbotsford
Transport in Abbotsford, British Columbia
1943 establishments in Canada